Adam Ginter is a Polish sprint canoer who has competed since the early first decade of the 21st century. He won six medals at the ICF Canoe Sprint World Championships with a gold (C-4 1000 m: 2002), a silver (C-4 500 m: 2003), and four bronzes (C-1 4 × 200 m: 2010, C-4 500 m: 2002, 2005; C-4 1000 m: 2003).

References

Living people
Polish male canoeists
Year of birth missing (living people)
Place of birth missing (living people)
ICF Canoe Sprint World Championships medalists in Canadian